Giniwara is a village in the Sindhanur taluk of Raichur district in the Indian state of Karnataka. Giniwara is located near to stream joining Tungabhadra river. Giniwara lies on Sindhanur-Olaballari route.

Demographics
 India census, Giniwara had a population of 2,498 with 1,244 males and 1,244 females and 405 Households.

See also
Salagunda
Alabanoor
Amba Matha
Olaballari
Sindhanur
Raichur

References

External links
raichur.nic.in

Villages in Raichur district